William mac Ulick Burke, 4th Clanricarde or Mac William Uachtar (Upper Mac William) (died 1430) was an Irish chieftain and noble.

William succeeded his elder brother, Ulick an Fhiona Burke, as chieftain. He was later succeeded by his nephew, Ulick;s son, Ulick Ruadh Burke, 5th Clanricarde.

William's era is one of the more obscure reigns of a Clanricarde. The Annals of the Four Masters have only two references to his term:

 1424. Mac William of Clannrickard (Ulick Burke) died in his own house, after having vanquished the Devil and the world.
 1430. An army was led by Mac William of Clanrickard, Mac Donough of Tirerrill, and Brian, the son of Donnell, son of Murtough O'Conor of Sligo, into Conmaicne Cuile, where they caused great conflagrations, and slew Hugh, son of O'Conor Roe, and Carbry, the son of Brian O'Beirne; and then they returned home in triumph.

Only in A New History of Ireland IX does it give his year of death as 1430. His successor, Ulick Ruadh Burke, would reign until 1485.

Genealogy

 Richard an Fhorbhair de Burgh (d.1343)
 Sir William (Ulick) de Burgh (d. 1343/53), 1st Mac William Uachtar (Upper Mac William) or Clanricarde (Galway)
 Richard Óg Burke (d. 1387), 2nd Clanricarde
 Ulick an Fhiona Burke (d. 1424), 3rd Clanricarde
 Ulick Ruadh Burke (d. 1485), 5th Clanricarde
 Edmund Burke (d. 1466)
 Ricard of Roscam (d. 1517)
 John mac Richard Mór Burke (d. 1536), 10th Clanricarde
 Ulick Fionn Burke (d.1509), 6th Clanricarde
 Ulick Óge Burke (d. 1520), 8th Clanricarde
 Richard Mór Burke (d. 1530), 9th Clanricarde
 Ulick na gCeann Burke (d. 1544), 12th Clanricarde, 1st Earl of Clanricarde (1543)
 Richard Bacach Burke (d. 1538), 11th Clanricarde
 Richard Óge Burke (d. 1519), 7th Clanricarde
 Sir Uilleag Burke (d. 1551), 13th Clanricarde
 William mac Ulick Burke (d. 1430), 4th Clanricarde
 Edmund de Burgh (d. 1410)

References

Further reading
 Burke, Eamon "Burke People and Places", Dublin, 1995.
 A New History of Ireland, IX, p. 172, Oxford, 1984.

External links
 http://www.ucc.ie/celt/published/T100005D/index.html

People from County Galway
15th-century Irish people
William mac Ulick